Daniel Foley may refer to:

Daniel Foley (jurist), American retired attorney and judge
Daniel Foley (professor) (1815–1874), Irish professor and Protestant missionary
Daniel R. Foley, American politician
Dan Foley (born 1960), Australian rules footballer